Cheikh Tidiane Mbodj (born August 1, 1987) is a Senegalese professional basketball player, who plays for Bambitious Nara of the B.League. He competed in college basketball for Cincinnati.

In the 2017-18 season Mbodj averaged 11 points and five rebounds in the Polish league. On July 17, 2018, he re-signed with Torun.

As a member of Senegal's national basketball team, he competed at the 2015 Afrobasket.

References

External links
Afrobasket.com Profile
University of Cincinnati Profile
Cheikh Mbodj - 5 x SLAM DUNK! - Youtube.com Video

1987 births
Living people
Basketball players from Dakar
BK Ventspils players
Centers (basketball)
Cincinnati Bearcats men's basketball players
Czarni Słupsk players
Dinamo Sassari players
Élan Béarnais players
Expatriate basketball people in Italy
Expatriate basketball people in Latvia
Grayson College alumni
Ilysiakos B.C. players
Junior college men's basketball players in the United States
Lega Basket Serie A players
Pallacanestro Cantù players
Senegalese expatriate basketball people in Poland
Senegalese expatriate basketball people in the United States
Senegalese expatriate basketball people in Greece
Senegalese expatriate sportspeople in Italy
Senegalese expatriate sportspeople in Latvia
Twarde Pierniki Toruń players